Moodysson is a surname. Notable people with the surname include:

Coco Moodysson (born 1970), Swedish cartoonist
Lukas Moodysson (born 1969), Swedish writer and film director

Patronymic surnames